SS Dante Alighieri was an Italian ocean liner for Transatlantica Italiana. From 1915 to 1927 the ship was in service between Italy and New York with calls at Lisbon, Gibraltar, Azores and Boston and between Italy and South America. In 1927, she was sold to Japanese firm Nippon Yusen Kaisha and renamed Asahi Maru. Operating as a hospital ship during early World War II, she later served as a transport. Asahi Maru was damaged in a collision in 1944 off the coast of Japan, beached and abandoned. The wreck was eventually scrapped in 1949.

History 
Dante Alighieri was built by Società Esercizio Bacini of Riva Trigoso in 1914 for Transatlantica Italiana. She was a  vessel, with a  length overall and a  beam. She had accommodations for 100 first-class, 260 second-class, and 1,825 third-class passengers. Launched on 28 November 1914, she sailed on her maiden voyage from Genoa to Palermo and New York on 10 February 1915. After the United States entered World War I, she was chartered as a troop transport and attached to the United States Navy Cruiser and Transport Force.
After the war ended, Dante Alighieri resumed her Genoa–New York service, continuing on the same route through October 1927. She departed New York for Lisbon, Naples and Genoa in November 1927. In 1928, the liner was sold to the Japanese firm of Nippon Yusen Kaisha (NYK) and renamed Asahi Maru. In 1937 she was converted into a hospital ship. In 1940, she had one of her funnels removed. On 24 January 1942, the hospital ship was hit by gunfire from the destroyer , during an American incursion on Balikpapan. On 10 November 1943 the vessel was converted to an auxiliary transport. On 5 February 1944, Asahi Maru was damaged in a collision in the Japanese Inland Sea, beached, broke in two, and abandoned. The ship's cargo was salvaged at end of February. She was scrapped in 1949.

References 

Ocean liners
Ships built in Italy
World War I passenger ships of Italy
Troop ships of the United States
Hospital ships in World War II
1914 ships